1830 in sports describes the year's events in world sport.

Boxing
Events
 Simon Byrne retains his English championship but no fights involving him are recorded in 1830.

Cricket
Events
 No-balls are shown separately on the scorecard for the first time.
England
 Most runs – Fuller Pilch 235 @ 29.37 (HS 70*)
 Most wickets – Jem Broadbridge 27 (BB 5–?)

Curling
 Establishment of the Orchard Lake Curling Club at Orchard Lake, Michigan; it is the first curling club in the United States and uses hickory block stones

Horse racing
England
 1,000 Guineas Stakes – Charlotte West
 2,000 Guineas Stakes – Augustus
 The Derby – Priam
 The Oaks – Variation
 St. Leger Stakes – Birmingham

Rowing
Events
 10 August — the Wingfield Sculls, amateur championship of the River Thames, is founded at the instigation of barrister Henry Colsell Wingfield and raced from Battersea to Hammersmith.
The Boat Race
 The Oxford and Cambridge Boat Race is not held this year

References

Bibliography
 Rowland Bowen, Cricket: A History of its Growth and Development, Eyre & Spottiswoode, 1970

 
Sports by year